Josef Franz, Archduke of Austria, Prince of Hungary (Josef Franz Leopold Anton Ignatius Maria; 28 March 1895 – 25 September 1957), was the eldest son of Archduke Joseph August of Austria and Princess Auguste Maria of Bavaria.  As his father was the last Palatine of Hungary and was briefly considered a possible King of Hungary in 1919–1920, Josef Franz was a potential crown prince of Hungary.

He was born during the reign of his great-grandfather (on his mother's side), Emperor Francis Joseph I of Austria, who was also his second cousin once removed on his father's side.

Marriage and issue

On 4 October 1924, Archduke Josef Franz married Princess Anna of Saxony, a daughter of Friedrich August III of Saxony and Archduchess Luise of Austria-Tuscany. Anna and Joseph Francis had eight children:

Archduchess Margit of Austria (born 17 August 1925; died 3 May 1979) married, in August 1944, Alexander Cech (born 23 March 1914; died 30 June 2008), son of Altábornagy Jószef Cech (1855-1938) and Donna Amalia Erba Odescalchi dei Principi di Monteleone (1889-1969)
Archduchess Ilona of Austria (20 April 1927 - 11 January 2011) married Georg Alexander, Duke of Mecklenburg
Archduchess Anna-Theresia (born 19 April 1928; died 28 November 1984)
Archduke Joseph Árpád of Austria (8 February 1932 – 30 April 2017), married Princess Maria von Löwenstein-Wertheim-Rosenberg
Archduke István Dominik of Austria (1 July 1934 - 24 October 2011), married Maria Anderl
Archduchess Maria Kynga (born 27 August 1938), married, firstly, Ernst Kiss. She married, secondly, Joachim Krist on 30 March 1988.
Archduke Géza of Austria (born 14 November 1940), married Monika Decker, secondly, Elizabeth Jane Kunstadter.
Archduke Michael of Austria (born 5 May 1942), married Princess Christiana of Löwenstein-Wertheim-Rosenberg (born 1940, daughter of Charles, Prince of Löwenstein-Wertheim-Rosenberg)

Archduke Joseph Francis of Austria died on 25 September 1957 in Carcavelos, on the Portuguese Riviera.

Ancestry

References

House of Habsburg-Lorraine
Knights of the Golden Fleece of Austria
1895 births
1957 deaths
Austrian princes
Burials at Palatinal Crypt